Richard or Dick Conway may refer to:

Dick Conway (baseball) (1865–1926), American baseball player
Dick Conway (rugby union) (born 1935), New Zealand rugby player
Richard Conway (writer), see List of Captain Scarlet and the Mysterons episodes
Richard Conway (special effects artist) (1942–2021), Academy Award nominated special effects artist
Richard W. Conway (born 1931), American industrial engineer and computer scientist